Kroonstad (Afrikaans directly translated "Crown City"), officially named Maokeng, is the third largest city in the Free State (after Bloemfontein and Welkom) and lies two hours' drive on the N1 from Gauteng. It is the second-largest commercial and urban centre in the Northern Free State (after Welkom), and an important railway junction on the main line from Cape Town to Johannesburg. Maokeng is Sesotho and means "place of the thorn trees (mimosa trees)".

History

Kroonstad was established in 1855 by the Irish pioneer Joseph Orpen, and was the first founded after the independence of the Orange Free State.
While  means "crown", this was in fact the name of a horse that had drowned in the nearby ford. A lover of animals, Orpen had witnessed the incident, and named the infant settlement in honour of the unfortunate creature. Similarly, the ford in question came to be known as Kroondrift.

During the Second Boer War, from 13 March to 11 May 1900, the city became the capital of the Orange Free State, and subsequently the site of a concentration camp to contain Boer women and children.

Economy

The main industry of Kroonstad is agriculture. It is the centre of a rich agricultural district, producing maize, wheat, dairy and meat products and wool. The Bloemhoek Dam lies just east of the town and supplies much of its water needs. A caravan park and many more camp sites on the banks of the willow-lined Vals River (Valsrivier) are frequented by anglers and watersport enthusiasts.

Leisure
Leisure opportunities are plentiful in Kroonstad, where visitors can enjoy golf on the 18-hole course in the town, lion tours and interaction with lion and tiger cubs at the Boskoppie Lion and Tiger Park, fishing in the well stocked Vals River or on the Bloemhoek Dam, and boating on the Serfontein Dam. Horseriding, gliding and hiking trails are also available.

Transport

Road

Kroonstad lies directly on the N1, which bypasses the town centre to the east (to Johannesburg in the north and Bloemfontein in the south). Other regional roads in the town are the R34 to Odendaalsrus in the south-west and Heilbron in the east, the R76 to Steynsrus in the south-east and Viljoenskroon in the north-west, the R721 to Vredefort in the north-west and the R82 to Sasolburg in the north-east.

Rail

Kroonstad Railway Station serves the town and is located on the important railway junction from Cape Town to Johannesburg via Bloemfontein.

On 4 January 2018, a passenger train, operated by Shosholoza Meyl, collided with a truck on a level crossing near Kroonstad/Hennenman. The train was derailed, and at least one of the carriages caught fire. Twenty people were killed and 260 were injured.

Air

Kroonstad is served by a small airport with no passenger flights.

Shopping

Shopping in Kroonstad is characterised by typical high street shopping. The development of the new Kroonstad Water Front Mall is underway, Maokeng Mall, Panorama Plaza, Checkers Centre, Shoprite Centre, Ultra City Centre and Pick'n'Pay centre.

General attractions
Kroonstad is said to be one of the Free State's loveliest towns and lies on the banks of the Vals River, a tributary of the Vaal, roughly two hours' drive from Johannesburg. It is situated in an area characterised by open spaces and an abundant variety of vegetation that makes it particularly beautiful. Kroonstad is a quaint town that serves as a good stop over en route between Johannesburg and Bloemfontein, lying as it does at virtually the halfway mark. Kroonstad offers an array of activities that include flea markets, a tea garden, fishing on the Vals River or at the Bloemhoek Dam, walking trails and lion tours and lion and tiger interaction at Boskoppie Lion and Tiger park. Today, as an important administrative, agricultural and educational centre, Kroonstad still boasts much of the inherent rugged beauty which led the Voortrekkers to establish the town where they did.

Sporting facilities of all kinds are well catered for, notably for jukskei, an Afrikaner folk sport. The headquarters of the SA Jukskei Council has been established here since 1951. The city is rich in historical sights; several historic buildings and statues, a former concentration camp, the Sarel Cilliers Museum (although currently inactive) and other places of national interest can be found here. Kroonstad is an important agricultural service centre in the Free State with a predominantly agricultural-orientated economy served by a modern toll-road. This brings the PWV Region within two hours drive from Kroonstad as well as being accessible from the North West, Bloemfontein and the Eastern Free State.

In July 2022 Kroonstad was announced as the winner in the Kwêla Dorp Van Die Jaar competition.

Historical sites

The Bloemspruit Monument  commemorates those who died in the Kroonstad Concentration Camp,

A Garden of Remembrance  commemorates Allied soldiers fallen in the two World Wars.

A blockhouse south of the city is a reminder of later stages of the Second Boer War.

Stone corbelled huts, refuges for the prehistoric inhabitants of the region, occur in various locations about the city.

In addition, fossils and San rock art are present in the region.

Notable people

 Banele Gaza, record producer
 Sid James, actor
 Angela de Jesus, artist
 David Kau, comedian
 Steve Komphela, football coach
 Antjie Krog, poet
 Min Shaw, singer
 Pallo Jordan, former ANC politician
 Teboho Mahlatsi, writer, co-creator, film producer
 Fana Mokoena, actor & EFF politician
 Jeffrey Ntuka, football player
 Max du Preez, journalist
 Levy Sekgapane, operatic tenor
 Al J Venter, writer and journalist
 Mantoa Tshabala-Msimang, former ANC politician
 Mosiuoa Lekota, former ANC politician 
 Winkie Direko, former ANC politician
 Robbie Wessels, singer
 Lize Beekman, singer
 Anton Goosen, singer
 Jan Blohm, singer
 Gert Smal, former Springbok rugby player and coach
 Andre Venter, former Springbok rugby player
 Faan Rautenbach, former Springbok rugby player
 Kulu Ferreira, former Springbok rugby player
 Burger Geldenhuys, former Springbok rugby player
 Michael Claassens, former Springbok rugby player
 Bok Fourie, former Springbok rugby player
 Sarel Cilliers, preacher, Voortrekker leader, leader at Blood River
 Alwyn Schlebusch, politician, Vice President of South Africa 1981
 Herbert Kretzmer, lyricist for the English-language musical adaptation of Les Misérables

Coat of arms
By 1931, the Kroonstad municipal council had assumed a coat of arms. It was registered with the Orange Free State Provincial Administration in February 1967 and at the Bureau of Heraldry in April 1971.

The arms were: Or, a tree on an island proper; on a chief Argent fimbriated Azure, a locomotive and tender Sable ("a golden shield displaying a tree on a grassy base, below a black locomotive and tender on a silver stripe across the top of the shield"). Originally, an imperial crown was placed above the shield, but it was replaced with a golden mural crown in the 1960s. The supporters were a black wildebeest and a blesbok, and the motto was Finis coronat opus.

Sister cities

Kroonstad has two sister cities whose names are reminiscent of its own:

  – Braşov, a city in Romania
  – Kronstadt, a Russian seaport city west of Saint Petersburg

See also
Voorspoed diamond mine

References

External links

kroonstadinfo.co.za: Kroonstad directory
Routes.co.za: Kroonstad
Allrefer.com: Kroonstad
NG Moederkerk

Populated places in the Moqhaka Local Municipality
Second Boer War concentration camps
Former national capitals
Populated places established in 1855
1855 establishments in the Orange Free State